Josué Nahúm Galdámez Domínguez (born December 18, 1982 in Usulután, El Salvador) is a former Salvadoran professional footballer.

Club career
He started his professional career at Second Division side El Vencedor and made his debut at the highest level, the Primera División de Fútbol de El Salvador, for a five year tenure with Municipal Limeño.

He then joined Salvadoran giants Águila together with his Municipal Limeño teammates Edwin González and Deris Umanzor only to leave them after a short spell for Chalatenango. In 2007, he returned to Municipal Limeño, then at the second level but jumped back to the Primera División with Atlético Balboa.

International career
Galdámez made his debut for El Salvador in a March 2001 friendly match against Guatemala and has earned a total of 26 caps, scoring 2 goals. He has represented his country in 6 FIFA World Cup qualification matches and played at the 2001, 2003 and 2007 UNCAF Nations Cups as well as at the 2002 CONCACAF Gold Cup.

His final international game was a February 2007 UNCAF Nations Cup match, against Guatemala.

International goals
Scores and results list El Salvador's goal tally first.

References

External links
 https://www.national-football-teams.com/player/2105/Josue_Galdamez.html

1982 births
Living people
People from Usulután Department
Association football midfielders
Salvadoran footballers
El Salvador international footballers
2001 UNCAF Nations Cup players
2002 CONCACAF Gold Cup players
2003 UNCAF Nations Cup players
2007 UNCAF Nations Cup players
C.D. Águila footballers
C.D. Chalatenango footballers
Atlético Balboa footballers